Kuhpar-e Sofla (also Romanized as Kūhpar-e Soflá; also known as Koohpar, Kūhpar, Kūhpar-e Pā’īn, and Kūh Par Pā’īn) is a village in Zanus Rastaq Rural District, Kojur District, Nowshahr County, Mazandaran Province, Iran. At the 2006 census, its population was 277, in 85 families.

References 

Populated places in Nowshahr County